Winter Fields may refer to:

Winter Fields (album) by Marié Digby
Winter Fields (painting), painting by Andrew Wyeth, 1942
The Winter Fields, poem by Sir Charles G.D. Roberts